The gold-spotted marsupial frog (Gastrotheca aureomaculata) is a species of frogs in the family Hemiphractidae.

It is endemic to Colombia.

Its natural habitats are subtropical or tropical moist montane forests, rivers, freshwater marshes, rural gardens, and heavily degraded former forest.
It is threatened by habitat loss.

References

Gastrotheca
Frogs of South America
Amphibians of Colombia
Endemic fauna of Colombia
Amphibians of the Andes
Amphibians described in 1970
Taxonomy articles created by Polbot
Taxobox binomials not recognized by IUCN